Harold Edgar Lapham (3 September 1911 – 2001) was an English professional footballer who played as a centre forward. He made appearances in the English Football League for Blackburn Rovers, Accrington Stanley and Wrexham.

References

1911 births
2001 deaths
English footballers
Association football forwards
Marine F.C. players
Netherton F.C. players
Everton F.C. players
Blackburn Rovers F.C. players
Accrington Stanley F.C. (1891) players
Wrexham A.F.C. players
Barrow A.F.C. players
English Football League players